Thomas Ludlam (ca. 1775 – 25 July 1810) was thrice Governor of Sierra Leone.

Thomas Ludlam was the son of William Ludlam and Frances Ludlam, née Dowley, and nephew to Thomas Ludlam the clergyman. He was baptised in Leicester on 15 September, 1775. 

He received a classical education. He shared his father's practical abilities and trained as a printer, being apprenticed to John Nichols. However shortly following the completion of his apprenticeship the opportunity for him to take up a post with the Sierra Leone Company (SLC) arose, and he moved to their colony in Africa.

Having previously served on the Council of the SLC, he subsequently rose to become governor, fulfilling the role three times: May 1799 – 1800, 28 August 1803 – January 1805 and 1806 – 27 July 1808.

On 19 November 1807, Ludlam arrested the American slave ship Triton, enacting the newly-established Slave Trade Act 1807.

He died on board  on 25 July 1810.

References

Platts, Charles,  2004, "Ludlam, William (bap. 1717, d. 1788), mathematician and writer on theology", Oxford Dictionary of National Biography. Accessed 14 August, 2018. Thomas Ludlam is included in the biography of his father.

 Schama, Simon, Rough Crossings: Britain, the Slaves, and the American Revolution (London: BBC Books, 2005) pp449-57

1770s births
1810 deaths
Governors of Sierra Leone